Vale do Paraíso is a civil parish in the municipality of Azambuja, Portugal. The population in 2011 was 880, in an area of 4.44 km².

References

Parishes of Azambuja